Connections (also referred to as New Connections and formerly Shell Connections and BT Connections) is the Royal National Theatre in London's annual youth theatre festival.
It was founded in 1995 and sponsored by Royal Dutch Shell until 2007 when the Bank of America took over the sponsorship. The plays are also published by the National Theatre each year.

Scheme
The National Theatre annually commissions ten plays from established playwrights which are performed by youth theatre groups across the UK. Groups are invited to perform at Connections Festivals held at a professional theatre in their area. A random performance group from each play is then performed at the end of the Festival at the National Theatre.

Professional productions
Several of the specially commissioned Connection plays have been professionally produced at the National Theatre. In 1999 Sparkleshark was performed. In 2006 three were produced; Burn by Deborah Gearing, Chatroom by Enda Walsh and Citizenship by Mark Ravenhill were performed in 2006; the latter two were revived in 2007 when they also toured. In 2008 Baby Girl by Roy Williams, DNA by Dennis Kelly and The Miracle by Lin Coghlan also received professional productions in the Cottesloe.

Commissioned plays

2022

Cable Street by Lisa Goldman
Chat Back by David Judge 
Find a Partner! by Miriam Battye
Hunt by Fionnuala Kennedy 
Like There’s No Tomorrow, created by the Belgrade Young Company with Justine Themen, Claire Procter and Liz Mytton 
The Ramayana Reset by Ayeesha Menon, with choreography by Hofesh Shechter, in association with Hofesh Shechter Company
Remote by Stef Smith 
Superglue by Tim Crouch 
Variations by Katie Hims 
You don't need to make a Big Song and Dance out of it by Abbey Wright, Shireen Mula and Matt Regan, in association with Tackroom Theatre

2019

Ageless by Benjamin Kuffuor
Chaos by Laura Lomas
Class by Doc Brown & Lajuane Lincoln
Flesh by Rob Drummond
Salt by Dawn King
The Small Hours by Katherine Soper
Stuff by Tom Wells
terra/earth by Nell Leyshon, with Choreography by Anthony Missen
The Sad Club by Luke Barnes, with Music by Adam Pleeth
Variations by Katie Himms

Source -

2018
BLANK by Alice Birch
The Blue Electric Wind by Brad Birch
The Changing Room by Chris Bush
The Free-9 by In-Sook Chappell
The Ceasefire Babies by Fiona Doyle
These Bridges by Phoebe Eclair-Powell
When They Go Low by Natalie Mitchell
Want by Barney Norris
The Sweetness of a Sting by Chinonyerem Odimba
Dungeness by Chris Thompson

Source -

2017
Three by Harriet Braun
"#YOLO" by Matthew Bulgo
FOMO by Suhayla El-Bushra
Status Update by Tim Etchells
Musical Differences by Robin French
Extremism by Anders Lustgarten
The School Film by Patrick Marber
Zero for the Young Dudes! by Alistair McDowall
The Snow Dragons by Lizzie Nunnery
The Monstrum by Kellie Smith

2016
Bassett by James Graham
Bedbug by Snoo Wilson, Gary Kemp & Guy Pratt
Blackout by Davey Anderson
Citizenship by Mark Ravenhill
Children of Killers by Katori Hall
Eclipse by Simon Armitage
Gargantua by Carl Grose
I'm Spilling My Heart Out Here by Stacey Gregg
It Snows by Bryony Lavery, Scott Graham & Steven Hoggett for Frantic Assembly
The Musicians by Patrick Marber
Take Away by Jackie Kay
What Are They Like? By Lucinda Coxon

2015
Drama, Baby by Jamie Brittain
Hood by Katherine Chandler
The Boy Preference by Elinor Cook and performed by Best Theatre Arts from St Albans, Hertfordshire
The Edelweiss Pirates by Ayub Khan Din
Follow, Follow by Katie Douglas and performed by The St Ives Youth Theatre from Cambridgeshire 
The Accordion Shop by Cush Jumbo
Hacktivists by Ben Ockrent
Hospital Food by Eugene O'Hare
Remote by Stef Smith
The Crazy Sexy Cool Girls' Fan Club by Sarah Solemani

2014
A Letter to Lacey by Catherine Johnson
Angels by Pauline McLynn
A Shop Selling Speech by Sabrina Mahfouz
Hearts by Luke Norris
Heritage by Dafydd James
Horizon by Matt Hartley
Pronoun by Evan Placey
Same by Deborah Bruce
The Wardrobe by Sam Holcroft
Tomorrow by Simon Vinnicombe

2013
The Guffin by Howard Brenton
Mobile Phone Show by Jim Cartwright
What Are They Like? by Lucinda Coxon
We Lost Elijah by Ryan Craig
I'm Spilling My Heart Out Here by Stacey Gregg
Tomorrow I'll Be Happy by Jonathan Harvey
Soundclash by Lenny Henry
Don't Feed the Animals by Jemma Kennedy
Ailie and the Alien by Morna Pearson
Forty-Five Minutes by Anya Reiss

2012

Victim Sidekick Boyfriend Me by Hilary Bell
Socialism Is Great by Anders Lustgarten
So You Think You're A Superhero? by Paven Virk
Prince of Denmark by Michael Lesslie
The Ritual by Samir Yazbek
Little Foot by Craig Higginson
Journey To X by Nancy Harris
The Grandfathers by Rory Mullarkey
Generation Next by Meera Syal
Alice By Heart by Steven Sater & Duncan Sheik

2011
Bassett by James Graham
The Beauty Manifesto by Nell Leyshon
Children of Killers by Katori Hall
Cloud Busting by Helen Blakeman adapted from the novel by Malorie Blackman
Frank & Ferdinand by Samuel Adamson
Gap by Alia Bano
Gargantua by Carl Grose
Shooting Truth by Molly Davies
Those Legs by Noel Clarke
Too Fast by Douglas Maxwell

2009
Blackout by Davey Anderson
Dirty Dirty Princess by Georgia Fitch
The Dummy Tree by Conor Mitchell
A Handbag by Anthony Horowitz
Heartbreak Beautiful by Christopher William Hill
The Heights by Lisa McGee
Six Parties by William Boyd
Success by Nick Drake
The Seance by Anthony Neilson
The Things She Sees by Ben Power
Trammel by Michael Lesslie
The Vikings And Darwin by David Mamet

2008
Scenes From Family Life by Mark Ravenhill
A Vampire Story by Moira Buffini
Theatre of Debate: Blackout by Davey Anderson inspired by the stories of a young person from Barnardo's, Glasgow
He’s Talking by Nicholas Wright
My Face by Nigel Williams
Theatre of Debate: Big Hopes a verbatim play by Gary Owen inspired by an xl. group from The Princes Trust, Cardiff followed by Safe by Deborah Gearing inspired by Fairbridge Southampton
Arden City by Timberlake Wertenbaker
The Peach Child by Anna Furse and Little Angel Theatre 
Theatre of Debate directed and devised by Jeremy Weller with young people from Fairbridge Centres in Kennington and Hackney.
The Book of Everything by Peter Tabern based on a novel by Guus Kuijer in the English translation by John Nieuwenhuizen
Fugee  by Abi Morgan.
It Snows  by Bryony Lavery and Frantic Assembly
Burying Your Brother in the Pavement  by Jack Thorne
DNA

2007
A Bridge to the Stars by Henning Mankell
A Year and A Day by Christina Reid
Baby Girl by Roy Williams
Red Sky by Bryony Lavery
Ruckus in the Garden by David Farr
Scary Play by Judith Johnson
Show and Tell by Laline Paull
Black Remote by Glyn Maxwell
DeoxyriboNucleic Acid (aka DNA) by Dennis Kelly

2006
Pass It On by Doug Lucie
The Spider Men by Ursula Rani Sarma
Broken Hallelujah by Sharman Macdonald
Pack Up Your Troubles by Snoo Wilson
Shut Up by Andrew Payne
Feather Boy by Nicky Singer and Peter Tabern with lyrics by Don Black and music by Debbie Wiseman
The Shoemaker's Incredible Wife by Federico García Lorca
The Miracle by Lin Coghlan
School Journey to the Centre of the Earth by Daisy Campbell with Ken Campbell
Liar by Gregory Burke

2005
Seventeen by Michael Gow
Blooded by Isabel Wright
Burn by Deborah Gearing
Chatroom by Enda Walsh
Citizenship by Mark Ravenhill
Just by Ali Smith
Lunch In Venice by Nick Dear
Mugged by Andrew Payne
Samurai by Geoffrey Case
Through The Wire a musical by Catherine Johnson

2004
Bedbug: The Musical by Snoo Wilson with music by Gary Kemp and Guy Pratt
Boat Memory by Laline Paull
Dead End by Letizia Russo (translated by Luca Scarlini and Aleks Sierz)
Discontented Winter: House Remix by Bryony Lavery
Eclipse by Simon Armitage
Headstrong by April de Angelis
Karamazoo by Philip Ridley (Script not included in the Shell Connections 2004 anthology book. Instead the first draft of the script was available to download for free from the NT Shell Connections website. The script received a physical release in 2015 as part of Ridley's play collection The Storyteller Sequence.) 
Moonfleece by Philip Ridley
The Musicians by Patrick Marber
Where I Come From: Scenes From Abroad by Mike Williams and Richard Nelson
The Willow Pattern by Judith Johnson

2003
Brokenville by Philip Ridley
The Crossing Path by Maya Chowdhry
Dust by Sarah Daniels
The Ice Palace by Lucinda Coxon
An Island Far From Here by Laura Ruohonen
Moontel Six by Constance Congdon
Multiplex by Christopher William Hill
Purple by Jon Fosse
The Queen Must Die by David Farr
Totally Over You by Mark Ravenhill

2002
Illyria by Bryony Lavery
The Actor by Horton Foote
The Bear Table by Julian Garner
The Exam by Andy Hamilton
Gold by Timothy Mason, Mel Marvin
Lady Cill, Lady Wad, Lady Lurve, Lady God by Kay Adshead
Nuts by Fausto Paravidino, Luca Scarlini and Zachery James Kinney
Olive by Tasmin Oglesby
Starstone by Christian Martin
Take-Away by Jackie Kay
Team Spirit by Judy Upton

2001
 After Juliet by Sharman Macdonald
 Electric Halos by Helen Adams
 Emperors and Clowns by Chris Barton
 Happy Endings devised by Danny Parker and Nigel Williams
 Human Puppets devised by Theatre Royal Bath Young People’s Theatre company
 Kids are from Mars devised by the London Bubble company
 Lagna by Jez Simons
 Les Juifs de Salonique…
 A Peasant of El Salvador by Peter Gould, Stephen Stearns, adapted by Mick Fitzmaurice
 Sunnyside by Neill Morton
 Ticking by Mari Binnie
 Time on Fire by Timothy Mason
 Too Too Tight devised by the Chichester Festival Youth Theatre Street Art Company

2000

1999
After Juliet by Sharman Macdonald
Can You Keep a Secret? by Winsome Pinnock
Devil in Drag by Dario Fo
Don't Eat Little Charlie by Tankred Dorst with Ursula Ehler
Early Man by Hannah Vincent
Friendly Fire by Peter Gill
Gizmo by Alan Ayckbourn
King of the Castle by Christina Reid
Pilgrimage by Paul Goetzee
Taking Breath by Sarah Daniels

1998

1997
Asleep Under The Dark Earth by Sian Evans
The Chysalids adapted by David Harrower from the novel by John Wyndham
Cuba by Liz Lochhead
Dog House by Gina Moxley
Eclipse by Simon Armitage
The Golden Door by David Ashton
In the Sweat by Naomi Wallace and Bruce McLeod
More Light by Bryony Lavery
Shelter by Simon Bent
Sparkleshark by Philip Ridley
Travel Club and Boy Soldier by Wole Soyinka
The Ultimate Fudge by Jane Coles

References

Youth theatre companies